Dumanlı (Sanda or Santa) was formerly a mid-sized community in Gümüşhane Province, Turkey, close to its border with Trabzon Province.

History
Established in the 17th century by Greeks who fled the coast of Pontus in order to escape the oppression of the Derebeys. It was an important caravan and mining village, with 13 neighborhoods and more than 5,000 citizens.

Before 1856, the inhabitants of Dumanlı were recorded as Christian (51%) and Crypto-Christian (49%). After 1856, with the Ottoman Reform Edict of 1856 that equalized all citizens regardless of religion (removing the "first citizen" status of the Muslims), they changed their status to Christian instead of Crypto-Christians, as pretending to be Muslim was no longer necessary to receive equal rights.

During the Greek genocide, the population tried to organize armed resistance against the Turkish army. Pontian guerrilla bands appeared in the mountains of Santa as early as 1916 with leadership Euklidis Kourtidis and successfully resisted against a Turkish attack on September 6, 1921.

Later during the Population exchange between Greece and Turkey, the Santa's citizens refused to accept the exchange and fought against being deported, but at the end they deported to Greece.
After the exchange, the village completely vacated and the lands and properties were registered in the Turkish treasury. The village's population settled in Greek Macedonia and Thrace. The town of Nea Santa was founded by them in the Kilkis regional unit in Central Macedonia.

Today
Today it is a sparsely populated district in the far north of Gümüşhane province, consisting of seven villages:

  Piştofandon: 400 houses, St. Kyriake, St. Panteleimon, St. Christophoros churches, a primary school and fountain of Christoforos. Etymology: pishtof, "gun" + anton toponymical suffix in Greek
  Zurnaciandon: 120 houses, St. Georgios, St. Constantine, St. Kyriake churches and a primary school. Etymology: Zurnaci, "zurna player", a reed woodwind instrument + anton
  Çakalandon:  53 houses, Zoodohu Pigis and St. Georgios churches and a primary school. Etymology: Çakal, "jackal" + anton
  Ishanandon: 150 houses. St. Kyriake, St. Georgios churches. 2 primary school (one of them only for girls). Etymology: Işhan, meaning "prince" in Armenian + anton
  Cozlorandon: 60 houses. St. Apostles Petros and Pavlos churches and a primary school
  Pinetandon: 30 houses. Prophet Elias and St. Georgios churches and a primary school
  Terzandon: 200 houses. St. Theodoros and Metamorfosis churches. Etymology: Terzi, meaning "tailor" in Turkish + anton

The Santa ruins were declared a Cultural-Archaeological Site and Natural Site in 1999. But as of 2022, only seven of the 13 villages with historical settlements have the conservation status.

See also
 Nea Santa, the Greek village founded by the former inhabitants of Santa
 Gümüşhane
 Trabzon
 Pontic Greeks

Notes

Geography of Pontus
Former Greek towns in Turkey
Villages in Gümüşhane Province